The 20th Satellite Awards is an award ceremony honoring the year's outstanding performers, films, television shows, home videos and interactive media, presented by the International Press Academy.

The nominations were announced on December 1, 2015. The winners were announced on February 21, 2016.

The film The Martian led all nominees with nine, including Best Film and Best Director (Ridley Scott).

Special achievement awards
Auteur Award (for singular vision and unique artistic control over the elements of production) – Robert M. Young

Humanitarian Award (for making a difference in the lives of those in the artistic community and beyond) – Spike Lee

Mary Pickford Award (for outstanding contribution to the entertainment industry) – Louise Fletcher

Nikola Tesla Award (for visionary achievement in filmmaking technology) – HIVE Lighting Plasma Wizards

Breakthrough Performance Award – Jacob Tremblay (Room)

Special Award for Breakthrough Comedian – Amy Schumer

Motion picture winners and nominees

Winners are listed first and highlighted in bold.

{| class=wikitable style="width="100%"
|-
! style="background:#EEDD82" | Best Film
! style="background:#EEDD82" | Best Director
|-
| valign="top" |
Spotlight
 The Big Short
 Black Mass
 Bridge of Spies
 Brooklyn
 Carol
 The Martian
 The Revenant
 Room
 Sicario
| valign="top" |
Tom McCarthy – Spotlight Lenny Abrahamson – Room
 Tom Hooper – The Danish Girl
 Alejandro G. Iñárritu – The Revenant
 Ridley Scott – The Martian
 Steven Spielberg – Bridge of Spies
|-
! style="background:#EEDD82" | Best Actor
! style="background:#EEDD82" | Best Actress
|-
| valign="top" |Leonardo DiCaprio – The Revenant as Hugh Glass Matt Damon – The Martian as Mark Watney
 Johnny Depp – Black Mass as James "Whitey" Bulger
 Michael Fassbender – Steve Jobs as Steve Jobs
 Tom Hardy – Legend as Ronald "Ronnie" Kray and Reginald "Reggie" Kray
 Eddie Redmayne – The Danish Girl as Lili Elbe
 Will Smith – Concussion as Bennet Omalu
| valign="top" |Saoirse Ronan – Brooklyn as Ellis Lacey Cate Blanchett – Carol as Carol Aird
 Blythe Danner – I'll See You in My Dreams as Carol Petersen
 Brie Larson – Room as Joy "Ma" Newsome
 Carey Mulligan – Suffragette as Maud Watts
 Charlotte Rampling – 45 Years as Kate Mercer
|-
! style="background:#EEDD82" | Best Supporting Actor
! style="background:#EEDD82" | Best Supporting Actress
|-
| valign="top" |Christian Bale – The Big Short as Michael Burry Paul Dano – Love & Mercy as young Brian Wilson
 Benicio del Toro – Sicario as Alejandro Gillick
 Michael Keaton – Spotlight as Walter "Robby" Robinson
 Mark Ruffalo – Spotlight as Michael Rezendes
 Sylvester Stallone – Creed as Rocky Balboa
| valign="top" |Alicia Vikander – The Danish Girl as Gerda Wegener Elizabeth Banks – Love & Mercy as Melinda Ledbetter
 Jane Fonda – Youth as Brenda Morel
 Rooney Mara – Carol as Therese Belivard
 Rachel McAdams – Spotlight as Sacha Pfeiffer
 Kate Winslet – Steve Jobs as Joanna Hoffman
|-
! style="background:#EEDD82" | Best Original Screenplay
! style="background:#EEDD82" | Best Adapted Screenplay
|-
| valign="top" |Spotlight – Tom McCarthy and Josh Singer Bridge of Spies – Matt Charman, Joel Coen, and Ethan Coen
 Inside Out – Pete Docter, Josh Cooley, and Meg LeFauve
 Love & Mercy – Michael Alan Lerner and Oren Moverman
 Straight Outta Compton – Jonathan Herman and Andrea Berloff
 Suffragette – Abi Morgan
| valign="top" |Steve Jobs – Aaron Sorkin Black Mass – Jez Butterworth and Mark Mallouk
 The Danish Girl – Lucinda Coxon
 The Martian – Drew Goddard
 The Revenant – Alejandro G. Iñárritu and Mark L. Smith
 Room – Emma Donoghue
|-
! style="background:#EEDD82" | Best Animated or Mixed Media Film
! style="background:#EEDD82" | Best Foreign Language Film
|-
| valign="top" |Inside Out Anomalisa The Good Dinosaur The Peanuts Movie The Prophet Shaun the Sheep Movie| valign="top" |Son of Saul (Hungary) The Assassin (Taiwan)
 The Brand New Testament (Belgium)
 Goodnight Mommy (Austria)
 The High Sun (Croatia)
 Labyrinth of Lies (Germany)
 Mustang (France)
 A Pigeon Sat on a Branch Reflecting on Existence (Sweden)
 The Second Mother (Brazil)
 The Throne (South Korea)
|-
! style="background:#EEDD82" | Best Documentary Film
! style="background:#EEDD82" | Best Cinematography
|-
| valign="top" |Amy (TIE) The Look of Silence (TIE) Becoming Bulletproof
 Best of Enemies
 Cartel Land
 Going Clear: Scientology and the Prison of Belief
 He Named Me Malala
 The Hunting Ground
 National Lampoon: Drunk Stoned Brilliant Dead
 Where to Invade Next
| valign="top" |Mad Max: Fury Road – John Seale Bridge of Spies – Janusz Kamiński
 The Martian – Dariusz Wolski
 The Revenant – Emmanuel Lubezki
 Sicario – Roger Deakins
 Spectre – Hoyte van Hoytema
|-
! style="background:#EEDD82" | Best Original Score
! style="background:#EEDD82" | Best Original Song
|-
| valign="top" |Carol – Carter Burwell The Danish Girl – Alexandre Desplat
 Inside Out – Michael Giacchino
 The Martian – Harry Gregson-Williams
 Spectre – Thomas Newman
 Spotlight – Howard Shore
| valign="top" |"Til It Happens to You" (Lady Gaga and Diane Warren) – The Hunting Ground "Cold One" (Jenny Lewis and Johnathan Rice) – Ricki and the Flash "Love Me like You Do" (Max Martin, Savan Kotecha, Ilya Salmanzadeh, Ali Payami, and Tove Nilsson) – Fifty Shades of Grey "One Kind of Love" (Brian Wilson) – Love & Mercy "See You Again" (DJ Frank E, Charlie Puth, Wiz Khalifa, and Andrew Cedar) – Furious 7 "Writing's on the Wall" (Sam Smith and Jimmy Napes) – Spectre|-
! style="background:#EEDD82" | Best Visual Effects
! style="background:#EEDD82" | Best Art Direction and Production Design
|-
| valign="top" |The Walk Everest Jurassic World Mad Max: Fury Road The Martian Spectre| valign="top" |Bridge of Spies – Adam Stockhausen Cinderella – Dante Ferretti
 The Danish Girl – Eve Stewart
 Macbeth – Fiona Crombie
 Mad Max: Fury Road – Colin Gibson
 Spectre – Dennis Gassner
|-
! style="background:#EEDD82" | Best Film Editing
! style="background:#EEDD82" | Best Sound (Editing and Mixing)
|-
| valign="top" |Sicario – Joe Walker Bridge of Spies – Michael Kahn
 Carol – Affonso Gonçalves
 The Martian – Pietro Scalia
 Spectre – Lee Smith
 Steve Jobs – Elliot Graham
| valign="top" |The Martian Inside Out Jurassic World Mad Max: Fury Road Sicario Spectre|-
! style="background:#EEDD82" | Best Costume Design
! style="background:#EEDD82" | Best Ensemble – Motion Picture
|-
| valign="top" |The Assassin – Wen-Ying Huang Cinderella – Sandy Powell
 The Danish Girl – Paco Delgado
 Far from the Madding Crowd – Janet Patterson
 Macbeth – Jacqueline Durran
 The Throne – Hyun-seob Shim
| valign="top" |SpotlightBrian d'Arcy James
Michael Keaton
Rachel McAdams
Mark Ruffalo
Liev Schreiber
John Slattery
Stanley Tucci
|}

Television winners and nominees

Winners are listed first and highlighted in bold.

New Media winners and nominees

Multiple winners

Film
 4 – SpotlightTelevision
 2 – Better Call Saul / Flesh and Bone''

References

External links
 International Press Academy website

Satellite Awards ceremonies
2015 film awards
2015 television awards
2015 video game awards
2015 awards in the United States
2015 in American television
2015 in American cinema